Tsageri (Cageris municiṗaliṫeṫi) is a district of Georgia, in the region of Racha-Lechkhumi and Kvemo Svaneti. Its main town is Tsageri.

Demographic

Population evolution

Ethnic Groups
Georgians represent 99,8% of the population. Russians represent 0,1% of the population.

Politics
Tsageri Municipal Assembly (Georgian: ცაგერის საკრებულო, Tsageri Sakrebulo) is a representative body in Tsageri Municipality, consisting of 30 members which is elected every four years. The last election was held in October 2021. Giorgi Nemsadze of Georgian Dream was elected mayor.

See also 
 List of municipalities in Georgia (country)

References

External links 
 Districts of Georgia, Statoids.com

Municipalities of Racha-Lechkhumi and Kvemo Svaneti